Marguerite Jeanne Carpentier (8 September 1886 – 7 November 1965) was a French painter and sculptor. She was born and died in Paris.

She had an artistic independence. She studied in the École des Beaux Arts (1903–1909) and met Auguste Rodin. Her work was part of the painting event in the art competition at the 1924 Summer Olympics. She wrote a Journal d’artiste (a diary), from 1930 to her death in 1965.

Her mother Madeleine Carpentier was also a painter.

References

Bibliography
 Marion Boyer, Une École de Femmes au XXe siècle, Éditions Un, Deux… Quatre, 1999
 Marion Boyer, Paris Trait pour Trait, Éditions Un, Deux… Quatre, 2001
 Marion Boyer (dir.): Marguerite Jeanne Carpentier  « La Refusée ». Livret rédigé à l'occasion d'une exposition en 2016 (online version, pdf)

External links
Le Delarge: Carpentier, Marguerite-Jeanne
OxfordArtOnline: Benezit Dictionary of Artists - Carpentier, Marguerite-Jeanne (subscription required)
Musée Elise Rieuf: Marguerite Jeanne Carpentier

1886 births
1965 deaths
French women painters
Painters from Paris
École des Beaux-Arts alumni
Académie Julian alumni
20th-century French painters
20th-century French women artists
19th-century French women artists
Olympic competitors in art competitions